This is a body of movies featuring flying cars (cars capable of flying as well as driving on the road)

Flying cars